Volodymyr Oleksandrovych Yavorivsky (11 October 1942 – 17 April 2021) was a Ukrainian poet, writer, journalist and politician.

Biography
Born in 1942 in the Crijopol region of Jugastru county (today part of Vinnytsia Oblast), Yavorivsky graduated from the Odessa State University as a specialist on "Ukrainian language and literature". He worked as an editor on the local radio, as a newspaper reporter ("Zaporizka pravda", "Literaturna Ukraina", "Prapor Yunosti"), a scriptwriter on Lviv television, a literary consultant, a referent of the Writer's Union of Ukraine and as the department chief and deputy editor to Vitchizna Magazine.

In the late 1980s, Yavorivsky began his active political career. He was a people's deputy of the last Supreme Soviet of the USSR in 1989–1991 and became one of the founders of People's Movement of Ukraine.

Volodymyr Yavorivsky took active part in defending the rights of the Chernobyl accident victims.

In the 4th Verkhovna Rada of Ukraine (2002–2006), Volodymyr Yavorivsky belonged to the Our Ukraine fraction and in the 5th and 6th Rada convocation to the Yulia Tymoshenko Bloc fraction. In the 2012 parliamentary election he was (re)-elected into parliament by winning a constituency in Kyiv for Batkivschyna.

Yavorivsky combined parliamentary functions with the position of the Writer's Union of Ukraine Chairman (appointed October 2001).

In the 2014 parliamentary election Yavorivsky again tried to win a constituency seat in Kyiv for Batkivschyna, but failed this time having finished fourth in his constituency with 13.72% of votes. The winner of the constituency, Boryslav Bereza, gained 29.44% of the votes.

He died on the 17th April 2021, aged 78.

Published works

Short story collections 
 A yabluka padayut (The apples are falling), 1968
 Гроно стиглого винограду (A cluster of mature grapes), 1971

Sketch collections 
 Kryla vygostreni nebom (Wings sharpened by heaven), 1975
 Tut na zemli (Here on the ground), 1977
 I v mori pamyatayu dzherelo (Remembering the source even at the sea), 1980
 Pravo vlasnogo imeni (The right of the own name), 1985
 Shcho my za narod takyi? (What a people are we?), 2002

Stories 
 Z vysoty veresnya (From the height of September), 1984
 Vichni Kortelisy, 1984

Novels 
 Lantsiugova reakciya (Chain reaction), 1978 about Chernobyl
 Oglyansya z oseni, 1979
 Avtoportret z uyavy (Biography of Catherine Bilokur), 1980
 Maria z polynom u kintsi stolittya, 1988, about the Chernobyl disaster
 Kryza (Crisis), 2000

References

External links 
Official site of Volodymyr Yavorivsky 

Ukrainian poets
First convocation members of the Verkhovna Rada
Second convocation members of the Verkhovna Rada
Fourth convocation members of the Verkhovna Rada
Fifth convocation members of the Verkhovna Rada
Sixth convocation members of the Verkhovna Rada
Seventh convocation members of the Verkhovna Rada
Odesa University alumni
1942 births
2021 deaths
Burials at Baikove Cemetery
Recipients of the Order of Merit (Ukraine), 3rd class
People's Movement of Ukraine politicians
All-Ukrainian Union "Fatherland" politicians
People from Vinnytsia Oblast